Charles Percival Davis (24 May 1915 – 4 July 2001), known as Percy Davis, was an English cricketer active from 1935 to 1957 who played for Northamptonshire County Cricket Club. He appeared in 169 first-class matches as a right-handed batsman. He was an occasional wicket-keeper and right arm medium pace seam bowler. Davis was born in Brackley, Northamptonshire on 24 May 1915 and died in Leicester on 4 July 2001. He scored 6,363 runs in first-class cricket with a highest score of 237, one of ten centuries. He was the elder brother of Eddie Davis.

Notes

Playfair Cricket Annual – 1948 edition

External links

English cricketers
Northamptonshire cricketers
1915 births
2001 deaths
English cricket coaches